This is a list of lists of villages in Norway, divided into sub-sections by county. The lists consist of populated places without city status.

See also

List of towns and cities in Norway
List of villages in Europe

 
Lists of villages by country